Anthonio Sanjairag (born 16 April 2002) is a professional footballer who plays as a centre-back for Thai League 1 club Chonburi. Born in Sweden, he has most recently represented Thailand at youth level.

International career
On 15 October 2021, Sanjairag was called up to the Thailand under-23 national team for the 2022 AFC U-23 Asian Cup qualification phase.

Personal life
Sanjairag was born and raised in Sweden and is of Thai descent.

Honours

Club
Djurgården
 Allsvenskan: 2019

References

2002 births
Living people
Swedish footballers
Anthonio Sanjairag
Association football defenders
Anthonio Sanjairag
Djurgårdens IF Fotboll players
Anthonio Sanjairag
Anthonio Sanjairag
Swedish expatriate footballers
Swedish expatriate sportspeople in Thailand
Expatriate footballers in Thailand